St. Christopher's Cathedral may refer to:

 St. Christopher's Cathedral, Roermond, the Netherlands
 St Christopher's Cathedral, Canberra, Australia
 St. Christopher's Cathedral (Barcelona, Venezuela)
 Belfort Cathedral, France